Lehra Assembly constituency is a Punjab Legislative Assembly constituency in Sangrur district, Punjab state, India.

Rajinder Kaur Bhattal (INC), who was the first and only female Chief minister of Punjab. She won five consecutive times from Lehra constituency from 1992.

List of MLAs 
Members of Punjab Legislative Assembly Lehra.

Election results

2022

2017

2012

See also
Punjab Legislative Assembly
 List of constituencies of the Punjab Legislative Assembly
 Sangrur district

References

External links
 

Assembly constituencies of Punjab, India
Sangrur district